Njiva Tsilavina Martin Rakotoharimalala (born 6 August 1992) is a Malagasy football winger who plays for Saudi Arabian club Al-Jandal.

Club career
A FOX Sports Asia article listed him as one of the top five players in matchday 13 of the Thai League 1.

On 12 August 2022, Njiva joined Saudi Arabian club Al-Jandal.

Career statistics

International

International goals
Scores and results list Madagascar's goal tally first.

Honours

Club
CNaPS Sport
 THB Champions League (5): 2013, 2014, 2015, 2016, 2017 
 Coupe de Madagascar (3): 2011, 2015, 2016
 Coupe des clubs champions de l'océan Indien (3): 2012, 2014, 2015

National Team
 COSAFA CUP 2015 third place: 2015

Individual

CNaPS Sport
 THB Champions League Best Player (1): 2014 
 THB Champions League top scorer (1): 2014 

National Team
 best squad France Football week international: 2018 
Knight Order of Madagascar: 2019

References

External links
 

1992 births
Living people
Malagasy footballers
Madagascar international footballers
Association football wingers
CNaPS Sport players
Njiva Rakotoharimalala
Njiva Rakotoharimalala
Al Jandal Club players
Njiva Rakotoharimalala
Saudi Second Division players
Expatriate footballers in Thailand
Malagasy expatriate footballers
Malagasy expatriate sportspeople in Thailand
Expatriate footballers in Saudi Arabia
2019 Africa Cup of Nations players
People from Antananarivo
Recipients of orders, decorations, and medals of Madagascar